Louchie Lou & Michie One were a British female ragga/soul duo from London, best known for the single "Shout (It Out)", plus their collaboration with Suggs on the single "Cecilia", both of which reached the top 10 of the UK Singles Chart.

Career
Louchie Lou (Louise Gold) and Michie One (Michelle Charles) met in 1991 at a Rebel MC gig. In 1993, they released their debut single, "Rich Girl", which samples the showtune "If I Were a Rich Man" from the musical Fiddler on the Roof. Later that year they had their first chart hit with "Shout (It Out)", which reached number 7 in the UK Singles Chart. It is a mash-up of the 1964 Lulu hit, originally recorded by The Isley Brothers, with the Henry Mancini composition, the "Peter Gunn theme" as performed by The Art of Noise and Duane Eddy from 1986. 

For their 1995 album debut, II B Free, Louchie Lou & Michie One collaborated with Sly and Robbie, and Quincy Jones' son QDIII. The album was released in October 1995 and contains the singles "Shout (It Out)", "Somebody Else's Guy (Me Did Love You)", "Champagne & Wine", "Secret Fantasy", "Get Down on It", "Free" and "Good Sweet Lovin'", which were all released between 1993 and 1996. International tours in Japan and the Far East along with a headline engagement at Japansplash festival brought visibility to Asian audiences.

Their second album, Danger-Us, released in the summer of 1996, features the single "The Honeymoon Is Over" as well as a cover version of the Brazilian hit, "Crickets Sing for Anamaria". That same year they were featured as vocalists on Suggs' hit, "Cecilia".
Danger-Us again featured QDIII and Sly and Robbie, with additional production work by Jazzwad (Buju Banton, Shabba Ranks) and Buzz Productions (Maxi Priest, Barrington Levy).

They have since released various compilation albums, including 7 Years of Plenty.

Michie One released a solo album entitled Power of One, although this was not issued in the UK. She is currently working on further solo material, and featuring her vocals on dance music tracks.

In 2004, Gwen Stefani remade "Rich Girl" for her single of the same name. In 2022, Puerto Rican singer Ozuna sampled Louchie Lou & Michie One's track for his song, "Somos Iguales".

Discography

Studio albums

Compilation albums

Singles

As lead artist

As featured artist

References

British reggae musical groups
English musical duos
Reggae duos
Female musical duos
Musical groups from London
Musical groups established in 1993
1993 establishments in England